A special election was held on April 8, 2017 in the St. Thomas-St. John District to determine the unfilled seat of the 32nd Legislature of the Virgin Islands.

References

2017
2017 elections in the Caribbean
2017 United States Virgin Islands elections